Fok Tak Temple is the only Chinese temple in Tsim Sha Tsui, Kowloon, Hong Kong. It is located on Haiphong Road and the current structure dates back to the year 1900. The temple was renovated in 1979 and 1993.

References

External links

 Archived Openlife entry

Taoist temples in Hong Kong
Tsim Sha Tsui